The Supreme Court of the Republic of China is the court of last resort in the Republic of China (Taiwan), except matters regarding interpretation of the Constitution and unifying the interpretation of laws and orders which are decided by the Constitutional Court of the Judicial Yuan.

History

The court in Taiwan (Formosa) was originally established in 1896, the second year after Taiwan became a part of Japan. The Taiwan High Court at this era, can be considered to be the de facto supreme court in Taiwan, because the case cannot be further appealed to the Supreme Court in Tokyo. After the second world war, Japan gave up its sovereignty on Taiwan, and the supreme court of Taiwan's judicial system has become the Supreme Court of the Republic of China.

The Supreme Court of the Republic of China was originally established as the  Ta Li Yuan in 1909. After the Chinese reunification, the government of the Republic of China renamed the Dali Yuan to the Supreme court in 1927 and made the Court the nation's court of last resort in 1928. In March 1949, the Court was moved to Canton with the Judicial Yuan. Shortly after in August 1949, the Court was moved to Taipei, Taiwan, where the Kuomintang government retreated after the Chinese Civil War. Originally it was located at Judicial Building at Chung-king South Road, but it was later moved to its current location on Chang-sha Street since 1992.

Introduction
The Court Organization Act states that the judicial system shall be composed of the Supreme Court, High Courts, and District Courts, in which the system of “three-level and three-instance” is used. The Supreme Court is the final appellate court for civil and criminal cases, except for civil cases involving amounts not exceeding NT $1,500,000 and petty offences enumerated in Article 376 of the Code of Criminal Procedure.

More specifically, the Court exercises jurisdiction over the following cases:

 appeals from judgments of High Courts or their branches as courts of first instance in criminal cases;
 appeals from judgments of High Courts or their branches as courts of second instance in civil and criminal cases;
 appeals from rulings of High Courts or their branches;
 appeals from judgments or rulings rendered by the civil court of second instance by the summary procedure, the amounts in controversy exceeding NT $1,500,000, and with permission granted in accordance with specified provisions;
 civil and criminal retrials within the jurisdiction of the court of third instance;
 extraordinary appeals; or
 any other case as specified by laws.

The Supreme Court of Taiwan consists of several chambers. Currently there are nine criminal chambers and nine civil chambers, each composed of five judges. Cases are distributed to chambers by random. The Supreme Court also convenes the "Civil Grand Chamber" and "Criminal Grand Chamber", to which potential contradicting Supreme Court decisions are submitted in order to unify statute and regulation interpretations.

Procedure
The Supreme Court is a court of cassation, which decides only issues of law, and must base its decision on the facts ascertained in the judgment of the court of second instance (High Court). An appeal is accepted only on the grounds that the original judgment is in violation of laws; appeals would be briefly rejected if the appellant merely argues about facts and interpretation of evidence. Typically there would be no hearings due to the fact that the Court does not deal with evidence related procedures such as cross-examination, but may still be convened if deemed necessary such as debates in law or psychological evaluation of the defendant for potential death sentence.

Once a case is brought to the Supreme Court and passed the check for brief dismissal, it will be assigned to a chamber. Cases before the Supreme Court are heard and decided by a panel of five judges, including a chief judge. If the chamber finds the case to be in violation of the law, the case would be reversed, and remanded to an inferior court if flaws exist in evidence acquisition or interpretation, or resentenced if the violation is simply a legal procedure error and there are no controversies upon the facts and evidence.

The Chief Justice of the Supreme Court is the highest ranking member of the court, and is appointed by the President. The Chief Justice is in charge of the administrative affairs of the entire court and also performs regular judge duty.

Chief Justice
 (5 November 1927 – 13 November 1928)
 (13 November 1928 – 5 November 1932)
Ju Zheng (5 November 1932 – 22 July 1935)
 (22 July 1935 – 26 September 1940)
  (30 January 1941 – 3 February 1945)
 Xia Qin (3 February 1945 – 13 July 1948)

Post 1947 Constitution
 Xie Yingzhou(13 July 1948－1966)
 (1966－1968)
 (1968－1972)
 (1972－1987)
 (1987－1993)
 (1993－1996)
 (1996－1998)
 (1998－2001)
 (2001－2007)
 (2007－2012)
 (2012－2015)
  (2015－2020)
  (2020－)

Prominent Judges
 Chang Chin-lan was the first female supreme court judge of the Republic of China.

See also 

 History of law in Taiwan
 Law of Taiwan
 Six Codes
 Constitution of the Republic of China
 Judicial Yuan
 High Court (Taiwan)
 District Courts (Taiwan)
 Ministry of Justice (Taiwan)
 Supreme Prosecutors Office
 Taiwan High Prosecutors Office
 List of law schools in Taiwan

References

Further reading
Chang-fa Lo, The Legal Culture and System of Taiwan, (Kluwer Law International 2006).

External links

Official Website of the Supreme Court of ROC
Taiwan Law Resources
The Judicial Yuan
The Ministry of Justice
Taipei District Prosecutors Office
Legislative Yuan
Executive Yuan

1927 establishments in China
Courts in Taiwan
Judicial Yuan
Taiwan
Law of Taiwan